Two-time defending champion Oliver Campbell defeated Fred Hovey in the challenge round, 7–5, 3–6, 6–3, 7–5 to win the men's singles tennis title at the 1892 U.S. National Championships.

Draw

Challenge round

Finals

Earlier rounds

Section 1

Section 2

Section 3

Section 4

Section 5

Section 6

Section 7

Section 8

References 
 

Men's singles
1892